Carabus convexus is a species of beetle found in almost all of Europe, but is somewhat rarer in the extreme Southwest. It is also widespread in East Asia.

References
Carabus (Tomocarabus) convexus Fabricius, 1775 (Carabidae) - atlas of beetles of Russia

convexus
Beetles of Europe
Beetles described in 1775
Taxa named by Johan Christian Fabricius